The Economy of Nigeria is a middle-income, mixed economy and emerging market with expanding manufacturing, financial, service, communications, technology, and entertainment sectors. It is ranked as the 31st-largest economy in the world in terms of nominal GDP, the largest in Africa and the 27th-largest in terms of purchasing power parity.

Nigeria has the largest economy in Africa. The country's re-emergent manufacturing sector became the largest on the continent in 2013, and it produces a large proportion of goods and services for the region of West Africa. Nigerias debt-to-GDP ratio was 36.63% in 2021 according to the IMF.

Nigerian GDP at purchasing power parity (PPP) has almost tripled from $170 billion in 2000 to $451 billion in 2012, though estimates of the size of the informal sector (which is not included in official figures) put the actual numbers closer to $630 billion. Subsequently, the GDP per capita doubled from $1400 per person in 2000 to an estimated $2,800 per person in 2012. Again, with the inclusion of the informal sector, it is estimated that GDP per capita hovers around $3,900 per person. The country's population increased from 120 million in 2000 to 160 million in 2010. The GDP figures were to be revised upwards by as much as 80% when metrics were to be recalculated after the rebasing of its economy in April 2014.

Although oil revenues contributed 2/3 of state revenues, oil only contributes about 9% to the GDP. Nigeria produces only about 2.7% of the world's oil supply. Although the petroleum sector is important, as government revenues still heavily rely on this sector, it remains a small part of the country's overall economy.

The largely subsistence agricultural sector has not kept up with the country's rapid population growth. Nigeria was once a large net exporter of food, but currently imports some of its food products. Mechanization has led to a resurgence in the manufacturing and exporting of food products, and there was consequently a move towards food sufficiency. In 2006, Nigeria came to an agreement with the Paris Club to buy back the bulk of its owed debts from them, in exchange for a cash payment of roughly US$12 billion.

According to a Citigroup report published in February 2011, Nigeria would have the highest average GDP growth in the world between 2010 and 2050. Nigeria is one of two countries from Africa among the 11 Global Growth Generators countries.

Overview
In 2014, Nigeria changed its economic analysis to account for fast-growing contributors to its GDP, such as telecommunications, banking, and its film industry.

Human capital is underdeveloped—Nigeria ranked 161 out of 189 countries in the United Nations Development Index in 2019—and non-energy-related infrastructure is inadequate.

Nigeria had advanced efforts to provide universal primary education, protect the environment.

A requirement for achieving many of objectives is reducing endemic corruption, which obstructs development and stains Nigeria's business environment. However, while broad-based progress has been slow, these efforts have begun to become visible in international surveys of corruption. Nigeria's ranking has mostly improved since 2001 ranking 154 out of 180 countries in Transparency International's 2021 Corruption Perceptions Index.

The Nigerian economy suffers from an ongoing supply crisis in the power sector. Despite a rapidly growing economy, some of the world's largest deposits of coal, oil, and gas and the country's status as Africa's largest oil producer, power supply difficulties are frequently experienced by residents.

Two-thirds of Nigerians expect living conditions to improve in the coming decades.

Economic history 

The following table shows the main economic indicators in 1980–2021 (with IMF staff estimates in 2022–2027). Inflation under 10% is in green. The annual unemployment rate from 1991 to 2009 (in italic) is extracted from the World Bank, although the International Monetary Fund find them unreliable.

NOTES:

The US dollar exchange rate is an estimated average of the official rate throughout a year and does not reflect the parallel market rate at which the general population accesses foreign exchange. This rate ranged from a high of 520 in March 2017 to a low of 350 in August 2017, due to a scarcity of forex (oil earnings had dropped by half), and speculative activity as alleged by the Central Bank. All the while the official rate was pegged at 360.

Per capita income (as % of USA) is calculated using data from estimates in the PPP link above, and census estimates, based on growth rates between census periods. For instance, 2017 GDPs were 1,125 billion (Nigeria) vs. 19,417 billion (USA) and populations were estimated at 320 million vs 190 million. The ratio is, therefore (1125/19417) / (190/320), which roughly comes to 0.0975. These are estimates and are intended to get a feel for the relative wealth and standard of living, as well as the market potential of its middle class.

This is a chart of trends of the global ranking of the Nigerian economy, in comparison with other countries of the world, derived from the historical List of countries by GDP (PPP).

This chart shows the variance in the parallel exchange rate at which the Dollar can be obtained with Naira in Lagos, with "Best" being cheaper for a Nigerian (i.e. stronger Naira).

For purchasing power parity comparisons, the US dollar is exchanged at US$1 to 314.27 Nigerian naira (as of 2017).

The current GDP per capita of Nigeria expanded 132% in the sixties reaching a peak growth of 283% in the seventies. But this proved unsustainable and it consequently shrank by 66% in the 1980s. In the 1990s, diversification initiatives finally took effect and decadal growth was restored to 10%. Although GDP on a PPP basis did not increase until the 2000s.

In 2012, the GDP was composed of the following sectors: agriculture: 40%; services: 30%; manufacturing: 15%; oil: 14%. By 2015, the GDP was composed of the following sectors: agriculture: 18%; services: 55%; manufacturing: 16%; oil: 8%

In 2005 Nigeria's inflation rate was an estimated 15.6%. Nigeria's goal under the National Economic Empowerment Development Strategy (NEEDS) program is to reduce inflation to the single digits. By 2015, Nigeria's inflation stood at 9%. In 2005, the federal government had expenditures of US$13.54 billion but revenues of only US$12.86 billion, resulting in a budget deficit of 5%. By 2012, expenditures stood at $31.61 billion, while revenues was $54.48 billion.

Agriculture 

The agricultural sector suffers from extremely low productivity, reflecting reliance on antiquated methods. Agriculture has failed to keep pace with Nigeria's rapid population growth, so the country, which once exported food, now imports a significant amount of food to sustain itself. However, efforts are being made towards making the country food sufficient again. Africa's most populous country has failed to grow more food for its fast-rising population who must be fed with staples ranging from rice, beans, maize etc.

Plant based agriculture 

Nigeria ranks sixth worldwide and first in Africa in farm output. The sector accounts for about 18% of GDP and almost one-third of employment. Though Nigeria is no longer a major exporter, due to local consumer boom, it is still a major producer of many agricultural products. Further agricultural products include palm oil and rubber.

Roots and tubers 

Counting by weight, this "underground food" is the largest group of food produced in Nigeria, with 118 million tonnes in 2020. This group includes yam, cassava, potatoes and sweet potatoes. These food products are cultivated mostly in the south of Nigeria ("Roots economy").

Cereals 
The group of sorghum, pear millet etc. is the second-largest group of food produced in Nigeria, with 28.6 million tonnes in 2020. 50% or 14 million tonnes of this is sorghum. The sugar cane production adds another 1.5 million tonnes to this. Cereals are mostly cultivated in the savannah zone of the country, and on the 23rd of June Nigeria's grain market report, the International Grains Council (IGC) placed Nigeria's total 2022-23 grains production at 21.6 million tonnes, this specific figure was reviewed from the previous month's forecast which was 21.1 million, It set the production in the year 2021–22 at 21.5 million which demonstrates and proves that there is an increase in the production of grains on the 23rd of June 2022 – 2023.

Rice and paddy 

The third-largest group of food produced in Nigeria is rice and paddy. In 2020, 8.2 million tonnes were produced.

Oil crops 
Nigeria produced a good 4 million tonnes of oil crops in 2020. These are e.g. soy beans, sunflower seed, canola and peanuts.

Citrus fruit 
Nigeria produced close to 4 million tonnes of citrus fruit in 2020. Main Nigerian citrus fruits are tangerine, grape, lemon and lime.

Cocoa 
Cocoa production, mostly from obsolete varieties and overage trees has increased from around 180,000 tons annually to 350,000 tons.

More products 
Beans, melons, pepper and vegetables are grown on chopping fields. Oil palms, rubber and bananas are grown for export. Palm oil plays a major role in Nigeria's burgeoning personal care products industry.

Livestock

Cattle 
In total, about 15 million head are kept. In addition, about five million pigs are kept. Small livestock such as sheep, goats and chickens are kept mainly for subsistence.

Poultry and Eggs 
An estimated 42% of Nigerians own chicken. As a result, poultry and eggs represent a popular commodity within the food industry. 46% of the poultry is kept in an extensive / free-range system. 300 thousand tonnes of poultry meat and 650 thousand tonnes of eggs are produced annually in Nigeria (estimation).

Fishing 
In the same year, the total fishing catch was 505.8 metric tons.

Timber 
Roundwood removals totaled slightly less than 70 million cubic meters, and sawn wood production was estimated at 2 million cubic meters.

Food processing

Peeling / Milling 
Until now, Nigeria paradoxically exported unhusked rice but had to import husked rice, the country's staple food. - The rice mill in Imota, near Lagos, is expected to do the relevant processing domestically, improve the balance of trade and the labour market, and save unnecessary costs for transport and middlemen. When fully operational at the end of 2022, the plant, the largest south of the Sahara, is expected to employ 250,000 people and produce 2.5 million 50-kg bags of rice annually. The Imota mill will be opened in the first week of August, 2022.

Coconut oil milling and refining 
A multi-billion Naira coconut oil refinery, first of its kind in Africa started business in Akwa Ibom State. The St.Gabriel Coconut Refinery in Mkpat Enin was inaugurated in May 2022. The governor of Akwa Ibom promised to commence immediate training of indigenous hands to man the refinery, said the facility has a daily capacity to crack 1,000,000 coconuts and will employ no fewer than 3,000 direct and indirect staff. Coconut oil goes for $1,326  per barrel, according to governor Emmanuel.

Dairy and meat 
Nigeria has 19 million head of cattle, the largest number in Africa. Yet the dairy sector in Nigeria is only able to supply less than 10% of the country's demand for dairy products (as of June 2021), a gap expected to grow in line with population growth.

Fan Milk, a Danone Group company, manufacturer of popular frozen dairy and ice cream brands, unveiled its newly completed model dairy in Odeda, Ogun state, in June 2022. This dairy farm is Danone's first investment in dairy farming in sub-Saharan Africa to boost local milk production in Nigeria. Fan Milk will launch a world-class dairy farm and training institute, leveraging the expertise of parent company Danone.

In Lekki's Free Trade Zone, the Dano Milk Factory (Arla) opened in 2022. - In 2021 farmer owned dairy co-operative Arla Foods started to build a dairy farm in Kaduna state with 200 hectares. It will keep 400 dairy cows and will have modern milking parlors and technology, also grass lands and living facities for 25 employees.

Bakery, household cereals etc. 
Nigeria's bread sector is growing fastly, with 72 percent dominated by small- and medium-scale bakers, according to a 2016 KPMG report. The bakery market of Nigeria is a $621 million industry.

"Fresh bread and miscellaneous bakery" is the bakery product group with the highest consumption (8.5M tonnes), which is 91% of total volume. "Fresh bread and miscellaneous bakery" exceeded the figures recorded for the second-largest product group "gingerbread, sweet biscuits and waffles" (689K tonnes), more than tenfold. The Nigerian bakery product market size is expected to show significant growth in the forecast period 2020–2026.

Primera Food in cooperation with Michael Foods starts producing noodles on a big scale in Ogun state in 2022.

Kellogg's opens a production plant for her products in the Lekki Free Trade Zone close to Lagos in 2022. It is the second factory Kellogg's has built in Africa.

In Jos NASCO Foods produces biscuits and corn flakes. In 2022 they expanded their Jos factory.

Mining and fossil fuel

Mining 

The mining of minerals in Nigeria accounts for only 0.3% of its gross domestic product, due to the influence of its vast oil resources. The domestic mining industry is underdeveloped, leading to Nigeria having to import minerals that it could produce domestically, such as salt or iron ore. Rights to ownership of mineral resources is held by the Federal government of Nigeria, which grants titles to organizations to explore, mine, and sell mineral resources.

Mining regulation is handled by the Ministry of Solid Minerals Development, which oversees the management of all mineral resources. Mining law is codified in the Federal Minerals and Mining Act of 1999.

Oil 

The types of crude oil exported by Nigeria are Bonny light oil, Forcados crude oil, Qua Ibo crude oil and Brass River crude oil. The U.S. remains Nigeria's largest buyer of crude oil, accounting for 40% of the country's total oil exports; Nigeria provides about 10% of overall U.S. oil imports and ranks as the fifth-largest source of U.S. imported oil.

The United Kingdom is Nigeria's largest trading partner followed by the United States. The stock of U.S. investment is nearly $7 billion, mostly in the energy sector. ExxonMobil and Chevron are the two largest U.S. corporations in offshore oil and gas production.

Natural gas pipeline Nigeria–Morocco 
The supply of natural gas to Europe, which is threatened by the Ukraine war, is pushing projects to transport Nigerian natural gas via pipelines to Morocco or Algeria. As of May 2022, however, there are still no results.

Process and Industrial Developments dispute 
Process and Industrial Developments Ltd (P&ID) entered into a 20-year contract with the Nigerian government for natural gas supply and processing. Nigeria provided the gas, which PI&D refined so that it could be used to power the Nigerian electrical grid. PI&D could keep valuable byproducts for its own use. In 2012, PI&D demanded arbitration in London, alleging that Nigeria had not supplied the agreed quantity of gas or to construct the infrastructure it had agreed to build. The arbitral tribunal awarded damages of more than £4.8 billion. The compensation was valued £8.15 billion with interest when the case was heard in London High Court in December 2022.

Industry

Cement 
Dangote and BUA are the dominating companies in the cement market of Nigeria. In May 2022 BUA opened a new, large scale cement plant in Sokoto including its own 50 MW power station.

Oil based products 
Paradoxically, Nigeria currently exports crude oil but has to import petroleum products such as petrol or polypropylene (plastic). In the fourth quarter of 2022, the much-talked-about Dangote oil refinery will come on stream, which will produce 50 million litres of petrol per day, among other things. This would turn Nigeria from a net importer into a net exporter of petroleum products. Even before it is fully operational, the Dangote refinery claims to a number of world records, including the world's largest distillation column and, with the RFCC regenerator, both the heaviest continuous piece of steel (made by a Korean forge) and the heaviest object ever transported on a public African road.

Fertiliser and paint 
On 3 May 2022, after years of construction, a fertiliser production plant was commissioned near Lagos that will produce 3 million tonnes of fertiliser a year. With no more Russian fertiliser coming onto the world market in 2022 due to the Ukraine war, Nigeria is filling a gap in the market. "The fertiliser market is a seller's market," enthused company boss Dangote at the plant's opening. "People are begging for us to sell and we are choosy about who we sell to."

A stone's throw away from the Dangote refinery BASF opened a factory in Lekki. BASF is mostly known for fertilizers, paints and lacquers.

Bodycare products, cleaning detergents 
The Colgate factory in the Lekki Free Trade Zone close to Lagos started to produce body care products in 2022.

Pharmaceutical industry 
Nigeria hosts about 60 percent of the pharmaceutical production capacity in Africa (status 2022) and is projected to grow between $60 billion to $70 billion after COVID-19, experts say. The pharmaceutical industry in Nigeria has headroom for growth and can potentially reach $4 billion over the next 10 years. Goldstein Market Intelligence analyst forecast the Nigeria pharmaceuticals market size is set to grow at a CAGR of 9.1% over the forecast years of 2017–2030.

Most larger pharmaceutical companies in Nigeria are located in Lagos.

The pharmaceutical producer with the most employees in Nigeria appears to be Emzor Pharmaceutical Industries Ltd. They produce more than 140 pharmaceutical products, including painkillers, vitamins, haematinics, antimalarials, tussives, antibiotics, anthelmintics, antihistamines, antacids and cardioprotectants.

Fidson Healthcare Plc produces painkillers, anti-allergics, blood pressure medicines, digestive aids, sleeping pills and cough syrup. May & Baker Nig. Plc produces remedis against malaria, hypertension, diabetes, depressions and pain. Swiss Pharma Nigeria produces pharmaceutical products of BAYER.

Vehicle industry 

Nigerians buy 720,000 cars per year, but less than 20% of these are produced in Nigeria itself.

Indigenous manufacturers

Innoson Vehicle Manufacturing is located in Nnewi. It produces buses, SUVs and since May 2022 tricycles which are locally known as "kekes".

Nord Automobiles Ltd has two assembly plants: one in Sangotedo, where all eight models are currently assembled; a plant in Epe is still under construction. The company currently manufactures its own plastic parts and plans to add steel stamping in the future.

30 km north-east of Lagos Proforce Ltd. produces armoured vehicles. Proforce sold an unknown number of armoured vehicles to Belarus in March 2022. This is the first time that vehicles manufactured in Nigeria have been supplied to a European country.

Jet Motor Company in Epe, Lagos State, is producing Nigeria's first electric-powered delivery trucks in partnership with GIG Logistics.

In Idah, Kogi State, Electric Motor Vehicle Company manufactures electrically powered vehicles. The company is owned by Prince Mustapha Mona Audu, a Glasgow-educated computer specialist and son of a former governor. In May 2022, Audu unveiled the four-seater Adoja, which he claims is the most environmentally friendly vehicle in Nigeria.

Foreign manufacturers

The Stallion Group assembles 45,000 Volkswagen models in Lagos per annum.

Peugeot Automobiles Nigeria (PAN) operates in Kaduna. In April 2022, Peugeot left the conglomerate and Aliko Dangote bought its shares. The company name was changed to DPAN. DPAN will assemble mainly the Chinese brands Chery and Higer using pre-produced parts. A new production line, Greenfield, will increase the output to 120 cars per day.

Toolmaking industry 
In Oshogbo, there is a modest toolmaking industry. Products are e.g. CNC turning machines and industrial drilling machines, but also stud bolts and flanges. Target market is the oil industry in the Niger delta.

Electronics 
The most successful manufacturer of laptops in Nigeria is, by their own admission, the indigenous Zinox Technologies in Lagos.

Steel production 
According to its website, Ajaokuta Steel Company Limited produces 1.3 million tonnes of steel per year. This would be equivalent to one-sixth of the UK's steel production in 2021. Steel plants in Katsina, Jos and Osogbo no longer appear to be active.

Services 

Nigeria ranks 27th worldwide and first in Africa in services output.

Finance sector 

Nigeria is the largest financial market in Africa.  As of November 2018, 21 commercial banks were licensed by the Central Bank of Nigeria (CBN).  Nigeria has a relatively well-developed banking sector by regional standards, with regionally high level of banking penetration (44.2% vs. regional average of 17.8% for West Africa) and robust use of advanced financial instruments in the local economy. The country is also well connected to international financial markets and following the 2016–17 oil crisis, the country has seen an increasing influx of foreign capital over the past 12–18 months – capital importation in Nigeria jumped to US$6.3 bln in Q1–18 (594% yoy growth) vs. $12.3 bln for full year 2017 and $5.1 bln in 2016). However, the country is weighed down by high lending rates, which limits access to credit for smaller firms, particularly in the non-oil economy.

Telecommunication 

The Nigerian Communications Commissions (NCC) said on January 14, 2022, the telecommunications sector contributed 12.45per cent to Nigeria's Gross Domestic Product (GDP). The commission through its chief executive officer (CEO), Prof Umar Garba Danbatta, during his convocation lecture, titled, “Empowering the Nigeria Youth Through Information and Communications Technology (ICT)” held at Fountain University, Osogbo, made this known. Prof Garba disclosed that the ICT sector has been consistently contributing above 10% of Nigeria's GDP for over 10 years. He noted, “Nigeria is Africa’s largest ICT market with 82per cent of the continent’s telecoms subscribers and 29per cent of internet usage."

Nigeria ranks 11th in the world in the absolute number of internet users and 7th in the absolute number of mobile phones.

Transport sector, forwarding, shipment 

Due to Nigeria's location in the centre of Africa, transport plays a major role in the national service sector.

The Buhari administration made improvements to the infrastructure after 2015. Extensive road repairs and new construction have been carried out gradually as states in particular spend their share of increased government allocations. Representative of these improvements is the Second Niger Bridge at Onitsha, which is nearly completed in May 2022.

Since 2009, Nigeria has been laying new railway tracks. These are operated by the state-owned Nigerian Railway Corporation. This has apparently generated a surplus since 2019, despite the covid epidemic.

Principal ports are at Lagos (Apapa and Tin Can Island), Port Harcourt (Onne), and Calabar. A deep sea port in Lekki, 50 km east of Lagos, is about to open in 2022.

Five of Nigeria's airports (Lagos, Kano, Port Harcourt, Enugu and Abuja) currently fly to international destinations. The new national airline, "Nigeria Air", is scheduled to start operations in mid-2022.

Entertainment

Movie industry, Television, Streaming 

From Nollywood, films and soaps are broadcast to the whole of Africa. Nigeria is the second largest film nation in the world after India and ahead of the US.

Music industry 

Perhaps Nigeria's most famous musician is the inventor of Afrobeat Fela Anikulapo Kuti, who gave legendary concerts with his band "Africa 70" at the "Shrine" in Lagos. Other characteristic musical styles include Jùjú, Apala, Fuji and Sakara. In the field of pop music, Nigerian musicians living in Europe such as Sade Adu or Dr. Alban were very successful in the 1980s and 1990s. In Europe, Nneka is one of the best-known Nigerian pop musicians. One of the very few Nigerian artists living in Nigeria who has had commercial success in Europe is D'Banj. He even reached the European singles charts in summer 2012 with Oliver Twist. Wizkid reached number 1 in 2016 alongside Drake.

Social media 
Nigerians are passionate users of social media. In 2021 Nigerians spent 3 hours and 41 minutes on social media in average every day. This is much higher than the global average of 2 hours 22 minutes. The number of active social media users in Nigeria increased in 2021 by 22 percent, compared with a global average increase of 13 per cent. WhatsApp and Facebook are the most used social media platforms in Nigeria.

Tourism

Data 
Electricity – production:
18.89 billion kWh (2009)

Electricity – production by source:
fossil fuel:
61.69%
hydro:
38.31%
nuclear:
0%
other:
<.1% (1998)

Electricity - consumption:
17.66 billion kWh (2009)

Electricity - exports:
40 million kWh (2003)

Electricity - imports:
0 kWh (1998)

Oil - production: 
 (July 2006 est.)

Oil - consumption:
 (2003 est.)

Overseas remittances 
A major source of foreign exchange earnings for Nigeria are remittances sent home by Nigerians living abroad. In 2014, 17.5 million Nigerians lived in foreign countries, with the UK and the USA having more than 2 million Nigerians each.

According to the International Organization for Migration, Nigeria witnessed a dramatic increase in remittances sent home from overseas Nigerians, going from US$2.3 billion in 2004 to $17.9 billion in 2007, representing 6.7% of GDP. The United States accounts for the largest portion of official remittances, followed by the United Kingdom, Italy, Canada, Spain and France. On the African continent, Egypt, Equatorial Guinea, Chad, Libya, and South Africa are important source countries of remittance flows to Nigeria, while China is the biggest remittance-sending country in Asia.

Labour force
In 2015, Nigeria had a labour force of 74 million. In 2003, the unemployment rate was 10.8% overall; by 2015, unemployment stood at 6.4%.

Since 1999, the Nigerian Labor Congress (NLC) a union umbrella organization, has called six general strikes to protest domestic fuel price increases. However, in March 2005 the government introduced legislation ending the NLC's monopoly over union organizing. In December 2005, the Nigerian Labour Congress (NLC) was lobbying for an increase in the minimum wage for federal workers. The existing minimum wage, which was introduced six years earlier but has not been adjusted since, has been whittled away by inflation to only US$42.80 per month.

According to the International Organization for Migration, the number of immigrants residing in Nigeria has more than doubled in recent decades – from 477,135 in 1991 to 971,450 in 2005. The majority of immigrants in Nigeria (74%) are from neighbouring Economic Community of West African States (ECOWAS), and that this number has increased considerably over the last decade, from 63% in 2001 to 97% in 2005.

The government has to pay a high interest rate on bonds in part because of the high fertility rate; there are many children and less savings.

Human capital

As of 2019, Nigeria's HDI (Human Development Index) is ranked 161st at 0.539. The comparative value for Sub-Saharan Africa is 0.547, 0.926 for the US, and 0.737 for the world average.

The value for the education index is 0.499, compared to the average in the US of 0.900. The expected years of schooling in Nigeria is 10.0 (16.3 in the US), while the mean years of schooling for adults over 25 years is 6.7 years (13.4 years in the US). Additionally, Nigeria is also facing a relatively high inequality, worsening the problem regarding the formation of human capital.

Government policy

Inflation 

In 2016, the black market exchange rate of the Naira was about 60% above the official rate. The central bank releases about $200 million each week at the official exchange rate. However, some companies cite that budgets now include a 30% "premium" to be paid to central bank officials to get dollars.

Nigeria's inflation rate rose to 15.63 per cent in December 2021 compared to 15.40 per cent in November, the National Bureau of Statistics announced on January 17, 2022. The statistics office said the prices of goods and services, measured by the Consumer Price Index, increased by 15.63 per cent in December 2021 when compared to December 2020. According to the NBS, this rise in the food index was caused by increases in prices of bread and cereals, food products, meat, fish, potatoes, yam and other tubers, soft drinks and fruits.

Foreign economic relations
Nigeria's foreign economic relations revolve around its role in supplying the world economy with oil and natural gas, even as the country seeks to diversify its exports, harmonize tariffs in line with a potential customs union sought by the Economic Community of West African States (ECOWAS), and encourage inflows of foreign portfolio and direct investment. In October 2005, Nigeria implemented the ECOWAS common external tariff, which reduced the number of tariff bands.

Prior to this revision, tariffs constituted Nigeria's second largest source of revenue after oil exports. In 2005 Nigeria achieved a major breakthrough when it reached an agreement with the Paris Club to eliminate its bilateral debt through a combination of write-downs and buybacks. Nigeria joined the Organization of the Petroleum Exporting Countries in July 1971 and the World Trade Organization in January 1995.

If the global transition to renewable energy is completed and international demand for Nigeria's petroleum resources ceases, Nigeria will be significantly weakened. It is ranked 149 out of 156 countries in the index of Geopolitical Gains and Losses after energy transition (GeGaLo).

External trade

In 2017, Nigeria imported about US$34.2 billion of goods. In 2017 the leading sources of imports were China (28%), the Belgium-Luxembourg (8.9%), the Netherlands (8.3%), South Korea (6.4%), the United States (6.0%) and the India (4.6%). Principal imports were manufactured goods, machinery and transport equipment, chemicals, and food and live animals.

In 2017, Nigeria exported about US$46.68 billion of goods. In 2017, the leading destinations for exports were India (18%), the United States (14%), Spain (9.7%), France (6.0%) and the Netherlands (4.9%). In 2017 oil accounted for 83% of merchandise exports. Natural rubber and cocoa are the country's major agricultural exports.

In 2005, Nigeria posted a US$26 billion trade surplus, corresponding to almost 20% of gross domestic product. In 2005, Nigeria achieved a positive current account balance of US$9.6 billion. The Nigerian currency is the naira (NGN). As of June 2006, the exchange rate was about US$1=NGN128.4. As of June 2019, it stands at US$1 =NGN357. In recent years, Nigeria has expanded its trade relations with other developing countries such as India. Nigeria is the largest African crude oil supplier to India – it annually exports  to India valued at US$10 billion annually.

India is the largest purchaser of Nigeria's oil which fulfills 20% to 25% of India's domestic oil demand. Indian oil companies are also involved in oil drilling operations in Nigeria and have plans to set up refineries there.

The trade volume between Nigeria and the United Kingdom rose by 35% from USD6.3 billion in 2010 to USD8.5 billion in 2011.

External debt
In 2012, Nigeria's external debt was an estimated $5.9 billion and N5.6 trillion domestic, putting total debt at $44 billion.

In April 2006, Nigeria became the first African country to fully pay off its debt owed to the Paris Club. This was structured as a debt write off of approximately $18 billion and a cash payment of approximately $12 billion.

Foreign investment

In 2012, Nigeria received a net inflow of US$85.73 billion of foreign direct investment (FDI), much of which came from Nigerians in the diaspora. Most FDI is directed toward the energy and banking sectors. Any public designed to encourage inflow of foreign capital is capable of generating employment opportunities within the domestic economy. The Nigerian Enterprises Promotion (NEP) Decree of 1972 (revised in 1977) was intended to reduce foreign investment in the Nigerian economy.

The stock market capitalisation of listed companies in Nigeria was valued at $97.75 billion on 15 February 2008 by the Nigerian Stock Exchange.

Swiss Banks to return Abacha Stolen Funds
The Swiss foreign ministry says it has done all it can to ensure that funds stolen by the late Nigerian dictator Sani Abacha were used properly in his homeland. The authorities were responding to allegations that $200 million (SFr240 million) of $700 million handed back by the Swiss Banks to Nigeria had been misappropriated.

See also
 Poverty in Nigeria
 Steel industry in Nigeria
 United Nations Economic Commission for Africa

References

Sources
 
 Nigerian Federal government Recruitment  careerwatch.ng 23 February 2020

Further reading
The World Bank Economic Report on Nigeria, May 2013

External links

World Bank Summary Trade Statistics Nigeria
Nigeria latest trade data on ITC Trade Map
Invest In Knowledge Based Economy In Nigeria 
Tariffs applied by Nigeria as provided by ITC's ITC Market Access Map, an online database of customs tariffs and market requirements

 
Nigeria
Nigeria
Nigeria